Dacko may refer to:

 David Dacko (1930–2003), first President of the Central African Republic 
 Ryan Dacko (born 1978), independent filmmaker based in Syracuse, New York
 Scott Dacko, Screenwriter and director